Anala Mons is a volcano on Venus. It is named after Anala, a Hindu fertility goddess. The feature was originally named Anala Corona. It is located at 11.0°N 	14.1°E, in a region called the Sappho Patera quadrangle where numerous other volcanic features can be found.

See also
List of montes on Venus
Volcanism on Venus

References

Volcanoes of Venus
Mountains on Venus

sv:Anala Mons